Jakub Suja (born November 1, 1988) is a Slovak professional ice hockey player who is currently playing for HK Dukla Michalovce of the Slovak Extraliga.

Career
He had most recently played for HC Košice of the Slovak Extraliga.

Career statistics

International

References

External links

1988 births
Living people
HC Košice players
HC Prešov players
HK Spišská Nová Ves players
Motor České Budějovice players
Stadion Hradec Králové players
HC Stadion Litoměřice players
MHC Martin players
Bratislava Capitals players
Slovak ice hockey centres
HK Dukla Michalovce players
Slovak expatriate ice hockey players in the Czech Republic